Karekadani (Dargwa: Кьаракьядани) is a rural locality (a selo) in Tsudakharsky Selsoviet, Levashinsky District, Republic of Dagestan, Russia. The population was 727 as of 2010. There are 4 streets.

Geography 
Karekadani is located 31 km southwest of Levashi (the district's administrative centre) by road. Burtanimakhi and Karekadani are the nearest rural localities.

Nationalities 
Dargins live there.

References 

Rural localities in Levashinsky District